The Larnoch Road murders were a high-profile double-murder case in Auckland, New Zealand. On 21 August 1989, Deane Wade Fuller-Sandys, a 21-year-old Auckland tyre-fitter, left home to go fishing. He never returned. His body was never found and authorities initially believed he probably drowned after being swept out to sea at West Auckland's Whatipu Beach, where his car was discovered shortly afterwards. Five days later, on 26 August 1989, Leah Romany Stephens, a 20-year old Auckland sex worker, also disappeared. Her skeletal remains were discovered in a forest near the Muriwai Golf Course three years later, in June 1992. Police enquiries at the time did not lead to an arrest in her case either.

It was not until police received a tip-off years later that the two deaths were related that Fuller-Sandys' disappearance was upgraded to a murder inquiry. After a two-year investigation, another sex worker, Gail Maney, was convicted of commissioning Stephen Stone, a gang member, to kill Fuller-Sandys over what was portrayed as a drug-related dispute. The murders allegedly took place in Larnoch Road in the suburb of Henderson where Maney used to live.  Stone was also convicted of the rape and murder of Leah Stephens, a witness to the killing of Fuller-Sandys. Two other men were also convicted of being accessories to the murder of Fuller-Sandys by disposing of his body.

The case is unusual in New Zealand legal history because of the decade-long gap between the crime and the conviction, the securing of a conviction despite a lack of forensic evidence, and the legal
 immunity granted to key witnesses. The case is also contentious as Maney continues to state she is innocent and that she never even met Fuller-Sandys, and because two key witnesses who testified at the trial have since recanted their original trial testimony.

Police investigation
In early 1997, Auckland police began to receive information that the disappearances of Deane Fuller-Sandys and Leah Stephens were connected – through their association with Gail Denise Maney. Maney (born  1967) was a sex worker and said to be in a relationship with Stephen Ralph Stone (born 1969), who had gang affiliations. She lived in a rental at 22 Larnoch Road, Henderson. Fuller-Sandys sometimes attended parties there and allegedly sold drugs to Gail Maney. In August 1989, when Maney and the other occupants were out, the place was burgled. Leather goods, money, and drugs were stolen. Based on a description of the burglar provided by a neighbour, police allege Maney believed it was Fuller-Sandys.

Police concluded that in August 1989, Gail Maney had ordered the killing of Deane Fuller-Sandys because she believed he had stolen drugs from her.  Police were told that Fuller-Sandys was enticed to come to Larnoch Rd on 21 August 1989 on his way to go fishing. When he arrived, he was attacked by Stone who then shot him in front of at least eight witnesses, among whom was Leah Stephens. Stone passed the gun to each of the four male witnesses, including Maney's younger brother Colin Neil Maney (born  1971) and a mutual acquaintance, Mark William Henriksen (born  1967), and directed them to fire bullets into the body to make them complicit in the murder. The men allegedly disposed of Fuller-Sandys' body in Woodhill Forest (although subsequent police searches failed to discover his remains), and left his vehicle at Whatipu Beach to make it appear he had drowned there. Five days later, Stone, believing that Leah Stephens was likely to inform police of the murder of Fuller-Sandys, raped and then murdered her with a knife at 22 Larnoch Road.

During the course of the investigation, the lead detective on the case, Mark Franklin, was discovered by other police officers sharing a joint in downtown Auckland. The incident could have ended Franklin's career, but he spoke to his supervisor about it before the other officers reported him and he was let off with a warning. The investigation continued for two years, after which Maney and Stone were arrested and charged with murdering Fuller-Sandys at Maney's home in Larnoch Road. Stone was also charged with the rape and murder of Stephens. Colin Maney  and Mark Henriksen  were charged with being accessories to the murder of Fuller-Sandys. All four denied the charges.

Trial

The trial was held in March 1999 at Auckland's High Court. The Crown was unable to produce a body or any forensic evidence such as DNA, blood-matches or weapons. Their case was based entirely on the testimony from witnesses who were interviewed eight or more years after Fuller-Sandys and Stephens disappeared. Two males who were alleged to be present (and participated in shooting Fuller-Sandys), and who admitted they had also disposed of Stephens' body at Muriwai,
were granted name suppression and immunity from prosecution in exchange for their trial testimony.

During the trial, lead investigator Mark Franklin was strongly challenged by defence lawyers over whether he had bullied witnesses, or pressured them to change their stories to match a predetermined police narrative. He denied these allegations. However, private investigator Tim McKinnel subsequently said: "There are concerns around some of the witnesses and their credibility and reliability. There are a number of wavering versions of events before a final version of events is settled on and we've seen that in cases before … Those sorts of things are concerning and I have questions around the way those statements and that evidence was collected over a period of time."

Verdicts 
After two days' deliberation, the jury found Stone and Gail Maney guilty of the murder of Fuller-Sandys. Stone was also found guilty of the rape and murder of Stephens. Both were sentenced to life imprisonment. Stone also received a 10-year concurrent sentence for raping Stephens. Colin Maney and Mark Henriksen were convicted of being accessories to the murder of Fuller-Sandys by helping to dispose of his body. Henriksen was sentenced to three years' imprisonment, while Colin Maney (the youngest of the accused) received a two-year suspended sentence.

Subsequent events

Appeals 
Gail Maney and Mark Henriksen appealed their convictions and were granted a retrial on the grounds that the original trial judge had not adequately summed up the case for their defence to the jury. However, both were again found guilty at their retrial in June 2000. In 2005, Gail Maney filed another appeal after one of the key female witnesses recanted her original trial testimony implicating Maney, but this appeal was also rejected.

Parole 
Maney was paroled in 2010, but was twice recalled to prison for breaches of her parole conditions. She served a total of 15 years in prison and remains on parole for the rest of her life. Three top lawyers, criminal barrister Julie-Anne Kincade, Nicholas Chisnall, and Aieyah Shendi, have agreed to represent her as she continues fighting to clear her name for a murder she says she did not commit. Private investigator Tim McKinnel has also agreed to assist.

Although Stephen Stone admitted to the killing of Fuller-Sandys during a restorative justice meeting with Fuller-Sandys' family in 2010, he subsequently recanted this confession and reverted to his claims of innocence. Stone was declined parole in December 2017, and will not be eligible for parole again until November 2019.

Media interest 

In 2018, Radio New Zealand and Stuff released a podcast documentary about the case, Gone Fishing. Subjects interviewed included Gail Maney, some of the key witnesses, and the former detective who led the police investigation, Mark Franklin. Franklin's reputation had been damaged after he was jailed for twelve months in the Cook Islands for selling cannabis to an undercover police officer there in 2010.

Concerns about the case

Lack of forensic evidence 

Fuller-Sandys' body has never been found. Despite a two-year investigation (eight years after Fuller-Sandys' disappearance), the Crown was unable to produce any forensic evidence such as DNA, blood-matches or weapons. Lead investigator, detective senior sergeant Mark Franklin (who was subsequently convicted for drug dealing), said "This was a case where there's no forensics; we didn't have scenes, we didn't have bodies, and [for] the evidence we relied totally on criminal associates who were involved in the crimes. That was probably one of the most challenging things." According to Tim McKinnel, who had worked to overturn the wrongful conviction of Teina Pora: "There is not a scrap of physical evidence to support the contention that Fuller-Sandys was murdered..."

Participants granted immunity 
One of the men who were present when Fuller-Sandys was killed (and has permanent name suppression) admitted to being among the eight people in the garage in Larnoch Road where Fuller-Sandys is said to have been shot. He and another witness supposedly helped bury Fuller-Sandys' body in dense bush somewhere in West Auckland. This man was also present when Leah Stephens was raped and murdered. When the case was brought to light again in the late 90s, he gave evidence against Maney and Stone in return for immunity from prosecution. He was also given $30,000 and a new identity under the witness protection scheme.

Doubts about the reliability of his evidence were raised after he appeared to have no knowledge of the crimes despite repeated questioning by police during the investigation. However, at one point during the investigation, he spent half an hour alone with Franklin, one of the lead detectives on the case. Immediately afterwards, he revised his statement to say he remembered both crimes – which helped the police tie the two cases together. Speaking to Stuff for the podcast Gone Fishing 27 years later, he said: "I had no knowledge of the events" claiming he only remembered what happened after he went to a hypnotist.

Two 'witnesses' retract 
Two people who testified that they were present when Fuller-Sandys was killed have subsequently retracted their statements. In February 2005 at a Court of Appeal hearing, Tania Wilson said she gave false evidence at Maney's two trials which implicated Maney in the killing of Fuller-Sandys. She said the police put her under pressure to testify against Maney. The court did not accept Wilson's recantation and dismissed Maney's appeal.

In July 2019, a second woman who gave evidence in the trial that convicted Gail Maney said she lied to police that she was present after being "threatened and harassed" by police. She said the police never interviewed her until 1997, eight years after Fuller-Sandys went missing, and that police pressured her by coming to her house in "marked and unmarked cars, sometimes in large numbers. They would search my house, (and) told me that they were going to make my life a misery if I didn't start playing ball, which meant admitting to my so-called role in his murder." She said she gave a false statement after police threatened to take away her young child but added: "My view was that he wasn't murdered and he was washed off the rocks fishing."

The second woman's story has been corroborated by Andrew Thompson, a former Henderson Police officer, who picked up the witness after she was interviewed by detectives investigating the death of Deane Fuller-Sandys and drove her to the airport. Thompson said she told him during the drive that she and the other woman had lied to detectives about being present when the alleged murder took place. Tim McKinnel who has been looking into the case told The New Zealand Herald he believed Thompson's account because it was consistent with other information he has.

Detective convicted of drug dealing 

Detective senior sergeant Mark Franklin smoked cannabis during his time as a police officer, including while working on this particular case. He took early retirement on psychological grounds  and was subsequently sent to prison in the Cook Islands for drug dealing. His lawyer told the court that Franklin had been a long-time user of cannabis, and smoked it to deal with job-related stress.

References

External links 
 Gone Fishing, 2018 Radio New Zealand documentary about the case.
 Leah Romany Stephens at BillionGraves

Crime in Auckland
Murder in New Zealand
Murder convictions without a body
1989 murders in New Zealand